Mao Kunii (born 5 April 1996) is a Japanese group rhythmic gymnast.

Career 
She represents her nation at international competitions. She competed at world championships, including at the 2015 World Rhythmic Gymnastics Championships where she won the bronze medal in the 5 ribbons event.

References

External links
 

1996 births
Living people
Japanese rhythmic gymnasts
Place of birth missing (living people)
Medalists at the Rhythmic Gymnastics World Championships
20th-century Japanese women
21st-century Japanese women